Henri Barabant (9 November 1874, Vougeot - 11 September 1951) was a French politician. He joined at first the Revolutionary Socialist Workers' Party (POSR), which in 1902 merged into the French Socialist Party (PSF), which in turn merged into the French Section of the Workers' International (SFIO) in 1905. From 1914 to 1919 Barabant represented the SFIO in the Chamber of Deputies. In 1919 he was not reelected. He belonged to the French Communist Party (PCF) from 1920 to 1922, after which he joined the Socialist-Communist Union (USC), which he represented in the Chamber of Deputies from 1924 to 1928. Thereafter he returned to the SFIO.

References

1874 births
1951 deaths
People from Côte-d'Or
Politicians from Bourgogne-Franche-Comté
Revolutionary Socialist Workers' Party (France) politicians
French Socialist Party (1902) politicians
French Section of the Workers' International politicians
French Communist Party politicians
Socialist-Communist Union politicians
Members of the 11th Chamber of Deputies of the French Third Republic
Members of the 13th Chamber of Deputies of the French Third Republic
Mayors of Dijon